Amy Markham is an American model and television personality. She currently lives in Los Angeles, California.

Early life
The daughter of an American father in the U.S. Army and a Korean mother, Markham was born in Seoul, South Korea. Her childhood was spent in Babenhausen, Germany, but due to her father's military duty, she was an "army brat" living all over. She spent the lengthiest amount of time in Killeen, Texas, which she considers her home town.

Modeling career
Markham first began modeling in 2010, working in the Japanese import automotive scene as a print and spokesmodel for several companies, magazines and race events, including the Xtreme Drift Circuit Racing Series (a national drifting competition), Performance Auto and Sound Magazine and Ace Custom Steering. Her first mainstream magazine shoot was with Rukus magazine in the US. Following its publication, she has appeared in a number of other international publications, including Vogue, Maxim, FHM, GQ, Esquire and Gentleman. In 2013, she was named FHM Magazine's Most Wanted Model.Amy also had a stint as a pornographic model under the alias Sandra, in the FTV (First Time Video Series) published by FTV Inc.; posing nude and performing in solo acts with fruits and vegetables.

Broadcasting career
In 2011, Markham became a host for Bite Me TV. A series exclusive to the web, Bite Me TV was broken into four series - Car Culture, Quick Bite!, Field Trippin and Bite Me! - the MAN cooking show. The show won an award for Outstanding Travel, Talk and Lifestyle Series at the 2011 LAWEBFEST. She went on to appear in the series Promo Girls on Telemundo. She has also made TV appearances for Anything That Rolls, a car-focused series on Channel 39 in Houston, TX.

References

External links
Official Site

1990 births
Living people
American female models
Television personalities from Los Angeles
American women television personalities
People from Killeen, Texas
American people of Korean descent
American expatriates in South Korea
American expatriates in Germany
21st-century American women